Julian Evans is the name of:

Julian Evans (writer) (born 1955), Australian writer and presenter
Julian Evans (adventurer) (born 1977), British adventurer and fund-raiser

See also
Juliana Evans (born 1989), Malaysian actress